On 28 February 2019 at least 30 people were killed and 60 others injured in three car bombing attacks followed by a siege in Mogadishu. The cars exploded near the Makka Al-Mukarama hotel. The attack happened in Makka Al-Mukarama road which was very busy at the time. Al-Shabaab has claimed responsibility for the attack.

The attack 
On 28 February 2019, at 9 pm local time, Islamist terrorists entered a house next to the Makka Al-Mukarama hotel after blowing up a car packed with explosives at its gate. The explosion occurred on the busy Makka Al-Mukarama Road during the evening rush hour. The Makka Al-Mukarama Road is the busiest and most heavily defended road in Mogadishu and is regularly targeted by Al-Shabaab gunmen because it is in the heart of Somalia.

The terrorist gunmen did not manage to enter the Makka Al-Mukarama hotel, so they stayed in the house next door, from where they kept firing at the special forces, soldiers and other gunmen who were sent to disarm and capture or liquidate them.

An hour after the first blast, two more car bombs exploded, one in front of the neighboring Hilaac UK restaurant and the other on the same road at the KM-4 junction.

The resulting state of siege with terrorists who had set up an armed base in the house lasted for 20 hours. It was the longest time that Islamist terrorists have been able to seize power in Mogadishu for any period of time since Somali troops backed by African Union peacekeepers ousted Al-Shabaab from the capital in 2011. Dahir Mohamud Gelle, Somali information minister, explained the protracted siege by saying that the operation was designed to avoid civilian casualties. Dahir Mohamud Gelle, Somali information minister, explained the protracted siege by saying that the operation was designed to avoid civilian casualties.

Background to the attack 
The attack on the hotel came on the same day that US forces said they had killed 81 terrorists in three airstrikes in the previous week and at least 226 Islamist insurgents in 24 airstrikes in the first two months of 2019. These military actions against Al-Shabaab, fighting to overthrow the Western-backed Somali government, are part of an escalation of the US fight against al-Qaeda-linked terrorist organizations, said Brigadier General Gregory Hadfield, Deputy Director of Intelligence at US Africa Command, who has 500 troops in Somalia.

References 

2010s in Mogadishu
2019 in Somalia
2019 murders in Somalia
2019 road incidents
28 February 2019 bombings
2010s road incidents in Africa
21st-century mass murder in Somalia
28 February 2019 bombings
Attacks on buildings and structures in 2019
28 February 2019 bombings
28 February 2019 bombings
Attacks on hotels in Africa
Car and truck bombings in Somalia
Improvised explosive device bombings in 2019
28 February 2019
February 2019 crimes in Africa
Islamic terrorist incidents in 2019
Mass murder in 2019
28 February 2019 bombings
Road incidents in Somalia
Terrorist incidents in Somalia in 2019
Somali Civil War (2009–present)
Hotel bombings
2019 disasters in Somalia